Lani Hotch, also known as Saantaas', Sekwooneitl and Xhaatooch, is a Native American artist of Tlingit ancestry known for being a contemporary Chilkat weaver who uses Ravenstail weaving in her works.

Biography 
Lani Hotch was born in 1956 in Klukwan, Alaska to a mother of Tlingit ancestry and a father from Northern California. She learned Chilkat weaving from her grandmother Jennie Warren during the mid-1970s but stopped when her grandmother died in March 1977. She began weaving again in 1990 when Cheryl Samuel came to Klukwan to teach Ravenstail weaving.

She has spent the majority of her adult life living in Klukwan with her children and husband. She specializes in basket weaving and uses spruce and root as materials. She has stated that she draws inspiration from her community and her local, natural scenic environment. Hotch began teaching classes about woolen weaving and felt application in her village, which she states "[passes] on the knowledge and skills I've learned. Students who learn these skills are then able to create their own dance regalia and hence, my teaching serves to strengthen the traditions of song and dance as well."

Select artworks 
 The Klukwan Healing Robe
 Berner's Bay Robe
 The Basket Mother Robe

Exhibitions

Solo exhibitions 

The Basket Mother Robe, The Spirit Wrestler Gallery, Vancouver Canada
Berner's Bay Robe, the Jilkaat Kwaan Heritage Center, Haines Alaska

Group exhibitions 
The Klukwan Healing Robe
Berries on a Sunshine Mountain, Time Warp, Vancouver Canada

Collections

Honors and awards 
 In 2006 Lani Hotch placed second place for contemporary arts in the Sealaska Heritage Institute's Juried Art show.
 In 2011 Hotch won the Jennifer Easton Community Spirit Award from the First Peoples Fund.
 In April 2017 Hotch was proclaimed a "Culture Bearer" by the Chilkat Indian Village (her tribe) which was one her highest honors. To this day she remains the only person in her community to be given such honor
 In 2017 Hotch won the Alaska Governor’s Award for Arts in Business Leadership.
 In 2017 Hotch won the Native Arts and Culture Foundation Mentor Artist Apprentice Fellowship.

Publications 
 Klukwan's Legacy of Warriors, Lani Hotch, [2014]
 Kaaya Haayi Hit, Lani Hotch, [2013]
 Kluwan Founding Fathers' Story, Lani Hotch. [2013]
 Uncle Albert's K̲u.éex', Lani Hotch, [2014]
 The Klukwan Healing Robe, Lani Hotch, [2013]
 Tsirku Héeni Naaxein = Tsirku River Woven Robe, Lani Hotch, [2014]
 Jilḵaat Héeni Naaxein = Chilkat River Woven Robe, Lani Hotch, [2014]
 Klehini Naaxein = Klehini River Woven Robe, Lani Hotch, [2014]
 Our life is close by our food, Lani Hotch, [2013]

References 

1956 births
Living people
20th-century Native Americans
21st-century Native Americans
Artists from Alaska
Basket weavers
Native American artists
Tlingit people
People from Haines Borough, Alaska